Wälzer is a surname. It may refer to:

Karel Wälzer (1888–unknown), Czechoslovak ice hockey player and Olympic medalist
Libor Wälzer (born 1975), Czech weightlifter and Olympics competitor

See also
Walser (surname)
Waltzer (surname)
Walzer (surname)

Czech-language surnames